William Vance Martin (June 6, 1938 – November 8, 1976) is a former professional American football halfback in the National Football League.

College career
Martin played college football for the University of Minnesota.

Professional career
He was drafted in the 1960 NFL draft in the fourth round  by the Chicago Bears. He played three seasons for the Bears from 1962–1964.

External links
http://www.pro-football-reference.com/players/M/MartBi01.htm

1938 births
1976 deaths
American football halfbacks
Chicago Bears players
Edmonton Elks players
Minnesota Golden Gophers football players
Players of American football from Chicago